Smolevichi is a rural locality (a selo) and the administrative center of Smolevichskoye Rural Settlement, Klintsovsky District, Bryansk Oblast, Russia. The population was 737 as of 2010. There are 14 streets.

Geography 
Smolevichi is located 9 km north of Klintsy (the district's administrative centre) by road. Melyakovka is the nearest rural locality.

References 

Rural localities in Klintsovsky District